Muḥammad Hāshim Thattvī (16921761;) was an Islamic scholar, author, philanthropist, and a spiritual leader who was considered a saint by his followers. He was the first ever translator of the Quran in Sindhi language.

Activities
He also ran the office of the Chief Justice and stayed the Governor of Sindh and connected areas of Punjab in the Kalhora era. He was also a feudal lord and tribe chieftain. He was the leading Islamic theologian and the Imam of the Grand Mosque at Thatta. He engaged himself in missionary duties and was famous among Sufis. He wrote Madah Nama Sindh (a book about Islam in Sindhi society and culture), Dirham al-Surrat Fi Wada al-Yadayn Taht al-Surrah (a book based on the Hanafi theology), Al-Baqiyat as-Salihat (a biography of great Islamic figures) and other books. His religious dictums shaped Sindhi culture and Islamic tradition in Sindh. He was believed to be a leading expert authority on the Fatwa-e-Alamgiri. He belonged to the Qadri order of Sufism, and followed the Hanafi school of thought. He has a large following throughout the Muslim world specially in Sindh and Thatta district in specific.

Family lineage
Thattvi descends from Al-Harith ibn Abd al-Muttalib of the Quraysh tribe,  to which the Islamic prophet Muhammad also belonged.

Early life and education
Makhdoom belonged to a very traditional, religious and educated family and received basic education from his father Makhdoom Abdul Ghafoor. His father taught him to memorise and recite the Quran. He further learned Persian language and Fiqh at home and travelled to Thatta the centre of education, poetry, spiritual grooming and culture of the time for receiving higher education. It was in the time of the Kalhora dynasty when Sindh was at its peak in reference to rich culture and economic progress. Scholars, poets, intellectuals were found in abundance and such people were very much obeyed, trusted and respected. Thatta had been entirely unique as in the year 1111 Hijri, it had 400 high schools and 1400 mosques and is considered a unique city even today. 

Makhdoom Muhammad went to Makhdoom Zia uddin Thattvi to learn the science of ahadith and associated matters. It took him nine years to learn Persian and Arabic. Meanwhile, his father Makhdoom Abdul Ghafoor died on 1113 Hijri in the blessed month of Dhul-hajj and was buried in his place at Sehwan.

Makhdoom visited Makkah and Madinah and learned exegesis, hadiths, religious fundamentals, tajwid and fiqh.

Books
He wrote books in Arabic, Sindhi and Persian including:
 Madah Nama Sindh (مدح نامه سنڌ): The book contains merits and values of Sindh and Sindhi society in the 18th century.
 Dirham al-Surrat Fi Wada al-Yadayn Taht al-Surrah. 
 al-Baqiyat as-Salihat (الباقيات الصالحات).

His authored books are included in the syllabus of Al-Azhar University today as well.
Some of his books have recently been translated into Sindhi by Allama Muhammad Idrees Dahiri and Ghulam Mustafa Qasmi, including Madah Nama Sindh, al-Baqiyat as-Salihat and Khamsat at-Tahirah.

Mausoleum and shrine
Thousands of devotees and followers visit his mausoleum and shrine every day which is located in Makli, Thatta, near the historical Makli graveyard. Many followers are buried alongside his shrine. Few of the names of the notables resting there are as follows:
Ubaidullah Sindhi and Hassam-ud-Din Rashidi.

Urs - Death Anniversary
Makhdoom Hashim's urs is celebrated every year on the 6th of rajab at the shrine.

The day's proceedings involve recitation of the Quran, hymns and praises of Allah and Muhammad and the Prophet, and religious discourses are given by local orators and scholars.

See also
Allah Baksh Sarshar Uqaili

References

External links
http://wikimapia.org/6133378/makhdoom-mohd-Hashim-Thattvi-tomb
https://archive.org/details/QasidaYaSalikasindhiLanguage
http://www.sindh.gov.pk/dpt/Usharzakaat/sehwan.htm
http://www.scribd.com/doc/46505203/List-of-Books-in-English0
http://jeaysindhqaumimahaz.blogspot.com/2010/11/chapter-2-era-and-political-environment.html

1692 births
1761 deaths
Persian-language poets
Hanafi fiqh scholars
Hanafis
Maturidis
Indian Arabic-language poets
Mughal Empire poets
People from Thatta District
Sindhi-language poets
Quranic exegesis scholars
Qadiri order
 Scholars from Sindh